Whiskey Chitto Creek, or Ouiska Chitto Creek, also known officially as Whisky Chitto Creek is an  spring-fed creek located in Allen, Beauregard, and Vernon parishes, Louisiana, in the United States. It is a tributary to the Calcasieu River and is located between present-day Mittie and Reeves, Louisiana.

Description
Whiskey Chitto Creek is part of the Calcasieu River Basin. The creek is surrounded by a mixed pine-hardwood mid-growth forest and passes through low hills. Common wildlife around this creek are livestock, turkeys, deer, and raccoons. It contains largemouth bass, spotted bass, and bream.

It passes through the Kisatchie National Forest, and is a landmark and common vacation spot for many locals in the region. It is overseen by the Vernon Unit of the Calcasieu Ranger District. It is a designated "scenic waterway" by the Louisiana Department of Transportation and Development. The U.S. Army Corps of Engineers declared it to be a 'navigable stream of the United States' in 2008.

Ouiska Chitto, meaning "Big Cane Creek," is a transliteration of the name given to the creek by the Choctaw people, the original settlers in this area. The Choctaw words were uski for cane and chito for large. French-speaking colonists and Anglo-American settlers adopted this derivation. later it was called "Whiskey Chitto Creek."

The United States Board on Geographic Names, the official arbiter of geographic names in the United States, decided in 1963 that the official name for the creek is spelled Whisky Chitto Creek.

References

 Cajun Country Area Bike Map
 Whisky Chitto Watershed - EPA "Surf Your Watershed"
 How Louisiana’s fishing hotspots got their names, by Captain Paul Titus. LouisianaSportsman.com, March 21, 2007

Rivers of Louisiana
Rivers of Allen Parish, Louisiana
Rivers of Beauregard Parish, Louisiana
Rivers of Vernon Parish, Louisiana